Augusto Max (born 10 August 1992) is an Argentine professional footballer who plays as a defensive midfielder for Uruguayan club Cerro Largo.

Career
Max began with Newell's Old Boys, before signing with San Martín. He was a senior member from 2008, though made his first two appearances across 2009–10 and 2010–11 against Sportivo Italiano and Tiro Federal as the club suffered relegation. No appearances followed in 2011–12, though he did play forty-two times in Torneo Argentino A across the next two seasons. Atlético Tucumán of Primera B Nacional signed Max in 2014. He made his bow versus Independiente Rivadavia on 24 October; his only match. A move back to tier three came with Mitre in 2015, which preceded tier two's Juventud Unida signing Max.

Ahead of the 2017–18 season, Max joined Primera B Nacional side Quilmes. His first appearance came on 18 September against Sarmiento, as he went on to participate in nineteen fixtures to finish twelfth. Max was demoted to Quilmes' reserves on 8 May 2019, before agreeing terms with newly-promoted Super League Greece side Volos a day later; penning a two-year contract, subject to the passing of a medical - which he later passed. He appeared twenty-eight times in one season with the club. On 18 August 2020, Max moved to Hungary with Diósgyőri.

Career statistics
.

References

1992 births
Sportspeople from San Miguel de Tucumán
Living people
Argentine footballers
Association football midfielders
San Martín de Tucumán footballers
Atlético Tucumán footballers
Club Atlético Mitre footballers
Juventud Unida de Gualeguaychú players
Quilmes Atlético Club footballers
Volos N.F.C. players
Diósgyőri VTK players
Cerro Largo F.C. players
Primera Nacional players
Torneo Argentino A players
Torneo Federal A players
Super League Greece players
Nemzeti Bajnokság I players
Nemzeti Bajnokság III players
Uruguayan Primera División players
Argentine expatriate footballers
Expatriate footballers in Greece
Argentine expatriate sportspeople in Greece
Expatriate footballers in Hungary
Argentine expatriate sportspeople in Hungary
Expatriate footballers in Uruguay
Argentine expatriate sportspeople in Uruguay